General elections were held in Bolivia on 14 July 1985. As no candidate for the presidency received over 50% of the vote, the National Congress was required to elect a President on 4 August. Although Hugo Banzer of Nationalist Democratic Action (ADN) received the most public votes, Congress elected Víctor Paz Estenssoro of the Revolutionary Nationalist Movement (MNR).

Campaign 
Since 1982, the country had undergone an economic crisis as Bolivia's hyperinflation reached the fourth largest ever recorded in the world. The incumbent President Hernán Siles Zuazo faced little support from Congress and debilitating strikes led by Juan Lechín. Under pressure from Congress, Siles ultimately allowed general elections to be moved forward by one year, thus shortening his own constitutional mandate.

The new elections, set for 14 July 1985, were the first to be held since the country's transition back to democracy in October 1982. The previous elections had been held in 1980 but were annulled by a military coup led by General Luis García Meza. As a result, a total of 18 political parties were on the ballot, the largest number out of any election in Bolivian history.  Former presidents Víctor Paz Estenssoro and Hugo Banzer presented themselves as candidates for the ADN and MNR. For Paz Estenssoro, this was his eighth presidential bid and the fourth since he was last elected in 1964 while this was Banzer's third campaign in a row since 1979.

On 14 December 1984, given the dire situation of the current government, Jaime Paz Zamora resigned his position as Siles' vice president to run for president. As such, the Revolutionary Left Movement (MIR) left its governing alliance with Siles' Leftwing Revolutionary Nationalist Movement (MNRI) and joined the opposition. Further splintering in the MNRI also saw members of the peasant sector split from the MNR and form the Leftwing Revolutionary Nationalist Movement-1 (MNRI-1). Nevertheless, the MNRI still opted to present Roberto Jordán Pando as their presidential candidate.

Results
The result saw Hugo Banzer of the ADN win the popular vote by 32.83%, 2.8 points ahead of Víctor Paz Estenssoro. The popular vote victory of Hugo Banzer was a testament to the gradual erosion of popularity of the opposition as well as to Paz Estenssoro's continued inability to win a majority of voters (since 1978 he had consistently reached either second or third place). Discontent with the economic management of the left-wing and constant strikes from trade unions (traditionally affiliated with the left) produced a rightward shift in the electorate.

Paz Zamora's position in third place at 10.18% was notable as it established his party as one of the three top political forces in the country and validated the MIR's decision to split with the MNRI. For the MNRI, the result was catastrophic. At just 5.48%, the incumbent was relegated to a minor political party. For the remaining 14 minor parties, the results demonstrated that regardless of the number of candidates, the population would mostly vote on only three to four viable parties leaving the rest with little political power.

By department

Congressional ballot
Only Hugo Banzer of the ADN and Víctor Paz Estenssoro of the MNR contested the 4 August Congressional ballot. Whilst Banzer was only supported by his own party, Paz also received the votes of the Revolutionary Left Movement (MIR), the Leftwing Revolutionary Nationalist Movement (MNRI), the Revolutionary Nationalist Movement-Vanguard (MNRV), the Christian Democratic Party (PDC) and the Revolutionary Liberation Movement Tupaq Katari (MRTK). Socialist Party-1 (PS-1), the Bolivian Socialist Falange (FSB) and the United People's Front (FPU) did not support either candidate. Víctor Paz Estenssoro, at age 78, became the oldest president in Bolivian history.

See also
Bolivian National Congress, 1985–1989

References

Bibliography 

 

Elections in Bolivia
Bolivia
1985 in Bolivia
1985
July 1985 events